The Phar Lap Stakes is an Australian Turf Club Group 2 Thoroughbred horse race for three-year-olds, at set weights, over a distance of 1500 metres, held annually at Rosehill Racecourse in Sydney, Australia in March. Total prize money is A$250,000.

History

Name

The race is named after probably the most famous horse and a symbol of Australian horse racing, Phar Lap the only horse in history to be the favourite in three successive Melbourne Cups.

Distance

 1973–2007 - 1500 metres
 2008 - 1550 metres (held at Canterbury)
 2009–2013 - 1500 metres

Winners

 2023 - Zougotcha 
 2022 - Mr Mozart 
 2021 - Hungry Heart 
 2020 - Funstar 
 2019 - Verry Elleegant 
 2018 - Unforgotten 
 2017 - Foxplay  
 2016 - Hattori Hanzo 
 2015 - Winx
 2014 - Traitor
 2013 - Toydini
 2012 - Colorado Claire
 2011 - Blackie
 2010 - Tickets
 2009 - Heart Of Dreams
 2008 - Acey Ducey
 2007 - Just Mambo
 2006 - Apache Cat
 2005 - Shania Dane
 2004 - Only Words
 2003 - Thorn Park
 2002 - Arlington Road
 2001 - Maitland Gold
 2000 - Lord Essex
 1999 - Mr. Innocent
 1998 - Northern Drake
 1997 - Monet's Cove
 1996 - Encores
 1995 - Brave Warrior
 1994 - Arborea
 1993 - Kaaptive Edition
 1992 - My Wanderin' Star
 1991 - Be Happy
 1990 - Solar Circle
 1989 - Flight Schedule
 1988 - Marwong
 1987 - Merry Ruler
 1986 - Periscope
 1985 - Prince Frolic
 1984 - Mr. Ironclad
 1983 - Northern Reward
 1982 - Calm Joe
 1981 - †Private Thoughts / Trench Digger 
 1980 - Blue Dane
 1979 - Fralo
 1978 - Luskin Star
 1977 - Blockbuster
 1976 - Cheyne Walk
 1975 - Knight Reign
 1974 - Imagele
 1973 - Toltrice 

† Dead heat

See also
 List of Australian Group races
 Group races

External links 
First three placegetters Phar Lap Stakes (ATC)

References

Horse races in Australia